Sudan competed at the 1984 Summer Olympics in Los Angeles, United States.  The nation returned to the Olympic Games after boycotting both the 1976 and 1980 Games.

Athletics

Men
Track & road events

Boxing

Men

References 
 Official Olympic Reports
sports-reference

Nations at the 1984 Summer Olympics
1984
Oly